Michael Spears (born December 28, 1977) is an Indigenous American actor. He is a member of the Kul Wičaša Lakota (often called "Sioux") of the Lower Brulé Tribe of South Dakota.

Early life
Michael Spears was born in Chamberlain, South Dakota near the Lower Brulé Lakota Sioux Reservation to Sičangu Lakota parents and lived there until he was in fifth grade. After that, his family moved to Pierre, South Dakota. Later, his family moved to Aberdeen, South Dakota where he graduated from Aberdeen Central High School in 1995.

He has six siblings. His younger brother, Eddie, is also an actor with film and television credits.

Career

Film/television
Spears' debut role as the child character Otter, in the Academy-Award-winning 1990 film Dances with Wolves, earned him national notice at thirteen years old. By the age of seventeen, Spears had acted in both TV and film with other prominent actors such as Kevin Costner, Jimmy Smits and Kim Delaney.

Spears' film credits include a major role as the character Dog Star in the 2005 Steven Spielberg-produced mini-series, Into the West, which aired on TNT.

In 2014, for his role as Tenkill in Angels in Stardust, Spears received critical acclaim in The New York Times.

His recent roles include a cameo in Taylor Sheridan's Western series 1883, a supporting role in Season 2 of Reservation Dogs on Hulu, and a supporting role in the series 1923 on Paramount.

Other work
In 2005, Michael and Eddie Spears modeled for Cochiti Pueblo fashion designer Virgil Ortiz for his "Indigene" clothing line and were featured on the cover of the August 2005 issue of New Mexico Magazine.

In 2013, he hosted the 38th Annual American Indian Film Institute Awards.

In 2014 and 2015, Spears played a recurrent role as Savanukah, a member of the 1777 Cherokee Delegation, in Colonial Williamsburg's open-air stage production of The Beloved Women of Chota: War Women of the Cherokee. He has also served as a musical contributor to other stage productions and media festivals such as the Bozeman Ice Festival and the Billings Symphony Orchestra. In 2021, Spears performed alongside other acclaimed Indigenous performers in the Billings Symphony Orchestra's symphonic production "Buffalo Crossing," which integrated the traditional music and dance of Plains tribes with orchestral music.

Personal life
Spears is an accomplished hand drum player and singer, often performing at powwows and other venues. He was the opening act for Rita Coolidge at her 2005 concert in Great Falls, Montana. Spears often travels to deliver speeches on inspirational and educational topics, including sustainable energy and mental health, and mentors Indigenous youth in Montana and South Dakota.

He worked with his late father, Patrick Spears, and his brother Eddie on ICOUP's (Intertribal Council on Utility Policy) Native Energy and Native Wind whose goal was to encourage creation of sustainable energy sources. Formed in 1994, ICOUP provided a forum for utility issues discussion from regulatory and economic perspectives.

Spears can speak some Lakota, which he first learned from his father and grandfather, and is continuing to learn. On the set of Dances with Wolves, Spears received Lakota language instruction from renowned Lakota language instructors Doris and Frank Leader Charge. During the filming of Into the West, he and the other actors had lessons from linguist Charlie White Buffalo.

Traditional Lakota ways and ceremonies are a priority for Spears, as he often takes part in spiritual and cultural events across the country. Spears has also engaged in activism for the Indigenous community, making appearances at environmental and MMIW, Missing and Murdered Indigenous Women, demonstrations and voicing his concerns about the misappropriation of Native culture through sports iconography.

Filmography

Awards

 Young Artist Awards: Nominated in 1993 for Best Young Actor Under Ten in a Television Movie as Adam in The Broken Cord 
American Indian Film Festival and Awards: Nominated in 2011 for Best Actor as Broken Wing in Yellow Rock
Awarded Bronze Wrangler Award at the Western Heritage Awards in 2012 for Lead Actor as Broken Wing in Yellow Rock
American Indian Film Festival and Awards: Nominated in 2013 for Best Supporting Actor as Bud "One Bull" Ward in The Activist

References

External links 

 Profile, michaelspearsactor.com; accessed March 16, 2015.

1977 births
American male film actors
Brulé people
Living people
Male models from South Dakota
American environmentalists
Native American male actors
Native American musicians
Native American actors
People from Chamberlain, South Dakota
21st-century American male actors
20th-century American male actors
People from Aberdeen, South Dakota
People from Pierre, South Dakota